Edward Antonio Rogers (born August 29, 1978) is a retired utility infielder who played with the Baltimore Orioles. He bats and throws right-handed.

Career

Baltimore Orioles 
In , he hit his only major league home run in his only at-bat of the season. It came against Alan Embree of the New York Yankees.

During a 2006 game against the New York Mets, as Rogers came in to pick up a bloop single into left field, the ball took an odd hop and went up his sleeve and he had to reach into the back of his shirt to get it out.

Boston Red Sox 
Before the  season, Rogers signed a minor league contract with the Boston Red Sox and was invited to spring training. During an exhibition game, on March 7, he hit a walk-off home run to beat the New York Mets, 9–5. In the 2007- offseason, he signed a minor league contract with the Washington Nationals. Rogers began the 2008 season with the Double-A Harrisburg Senators of the Eastern League and also saw time with the Triple-A Columbus Clippers. He became a free agent at the end of the season.

Arizona Diamondbacks 
On June 4, 2009, Rogers signed a Minor League deal with the Arizona Diamondbacks organization.

He was granted Free Agency at end of 2009 Season

External links

Baseball Almanac

1978 births
Aberdeen IronBirds players
Arizona League Diamondbacks players
Baltimore Orioles players
Bowie Baysox players
Bridgeport Bluefish players
Columbus Clippers players
Delmarva Shorebirds players
Dominican Republic expatriate baseball players in Canada
Dominican Republic expatriate baseball players in Mexico
Dominican Republic expatriate baseball players in the United States
Frederick Keys players
Gulf Coast Orioles players
Harrisburg Senators players

Living people
Major League Baseball infielders
Major League Baseball players from the Dominican Republic
Mexican League baseball infielders
Mexican League baseball left fielders
Mexican League baseball right fielders
Ottawa Lynx players
Pawtucket Red Sox players
Piratas de Campeche players
Reno Aces players
Estrellas Orientales players